Raja Chatrapati Singh (1919–1998) was an Indian percussionist. He was famous for his virtuosity  on Pakhavaj drums used in Hindustani Classical Music.

Biography
Chatrapati (also spelled Chhatrapati) Singh Ju Deo was born in the Royal family of Bijna State in Uttar Pradesh, bordering Madhya Pradesh, India. His grandfather Raja Mukund Singh and father Raja Himmat Singh were patrons of music. He showed a great deal of interest in music from a very early age and started learning Pakhavaj from several masters including Shri Kudau Singh Ji and Swami Ramdas Ji.
He became the foremost exponent of the Pakhavaj of his era. He accompanied all the great Dhrupad vocalists including the Dagar Brothers and Pt. Ram Chatur Malik.

His daughter Chandra Singh is a talented Sitar player and his son Raja Surya Pratap Singh also played the Sitar and frequently accompanied his father during his programs.

Singh was awarded the Sangeet Natak Akademi award in 1991. Apart from music he was very fond of traditional wrestling, chess, and mathematics and has written a treatise on knight moves in chess called "Ashwa Nirupan Granth". Singh died in 1998.

External links
 Sound recording: Pakhawaj Solo in Chautal
 Sound recording: Pakhawaj Solo in Singh-Krishna tal

1919 births
1998 deaths
Indian percussionists
Recipients of the Sangeet Natak Akademi Award
20th-century Indian musicians
20th-century drummers
Indian male classical musicians
20th-century Indian male singers
20th-century Indian singers